Drymaeus strigatus is a species of  tropical air-breathing land snail, a pulmonate gastropod mollusk in the family Bulimulidae.

Distribution 

 Peru
 Ecuador

Description 
The living animal is brownish-beige, slightly darker just above the foot. The tentacles are whitish at the base and turning light-beige towards the eyes.

References
This article incorporates CC-BY-3.0 text from the reference

Further reading 
 Pilsbry H. A. (1897-1898). "American Bulimulidae: Bulimulus, Neopetraeus, Oxychona, and South American Drymaeus". Manual of Conchology (2)11: 1-339. page 228.

Drymaeus
Gastropods described in 1838